The Antun Branko Šimić Award is an award for contributions to Croatian poetry by Croats from Bosnia and Herzegovina or members of the Croatian Writers' Society of Herzeg-Bosnia. It is named after the Herzegovinian Croat poet Antun Branko Šimić. It was briefly awarded in Yugoslavia under the name Braća Šimić Award and was later reinstated under its current name in 1998.

Awardees 
 1998: Gojko Sušac for Jutarnja novost
 1999: Zdravko Kordić for Zipka i smrt
 2000: Željko Ivanković for (D)ogledi III. and Dubravko Horvatić for Svjetionik
 2001: Ante Matić for Nebeska galija and Pero Pavlović for Nebeske latice
 2002: Andrija Vučemil for Glas (na)glas za glas and Nenad Valentin Borozan for lišce.teret od zrcala
 2003: Ružica Soldo for Sanjar
 2004: Zdravko Luburić for Molitva tmine
 2005: Mile Maslać for Vrijeme pripravnosti
 2006: Borislav Arapović for Prolomom
 2007: Malkica Dugeč for U riječ unjedrena
 2008: Rajko Glibo for Očitovanja and Antun Lučić for Veze ljudi, životinja i stvari
 2009: Mile Pešorda for Baščanska ploča, poema
 2010: Šimun Musa for Studije i ogledi
 2011: Ante Stamać for Sabrane pjesme
 2012: S. Marija od Presvetoga Srca (Anka Petričević) for Pjesme srca 
 2013: Julienne Eden Bušić for Živa glava 
 2014: Ivan Aralica for  Japundže 
 2015: Ante Zirdum for Učiteljica modnog krojenja u Sarajevu 2014. 
 2016: Drago Čondrič for Sedam velikih biblijskih poema 
 2017: Ljubo Krmek for Iz humske zemlje-knjiga druga 
 2018: Marina Kljajo-Radić for Pjesništvo Lucijana Kordića 
 2019: Joso Živković for Tragom pokorenih želja 
 2020: Tomislav Marijan Bilosnić for Havana blues 
 2021:
 2022: Stijepo Mijović Kočan for Bože moj

References

External links 
 List of Awardees on Croatian Writers Association Herzeg Bosnia - Mostar site

Croatian poetry
Bosnia and Herzegovina culture
Poetry awards
Awards established in 1998